Platelet-activating factor acetylhydrolase 2, cytoplasmic is an enzyme that in humans is encoded by the PAFAH2 gene. It is one of several PAF acetylhydrolases.

Function 

This gene encodes platelet-activating factor acetylhydrolase isoform 2, a single-subunit intracellular enzyme that catalyzes the removal of the acetyl group at the SN-2 position of platelet-activating factor (identified as 1-O-alkyl-2-acetyl-sn-glyceryl-3-phosphorylcholine). However, this lipase exhibits a broader substrate specificity than simply platelet activating factor. Two other isoforms of intracellular platelet-activating factor acetylhydrolase exist, and both are multi-subunit enzymes. Additionally, there is a single-subunit serum isoform of this enzyme.

References

Further reading